Lovozero is a military air base in Murmansk Oblast, Russia, located  northwest of Lovozero.  It serves as a helicopter base.

Soviet Air Force bases
Buildings and structures in Murmansk Oblast